In numerical linear algebra, the Gauss–Seidel method, also known as the Liebmann method or the method of successive displacement,  is an iterative method used to solve a system of linear equations. It is named after the German mathematicians Carl Friedrich Gauss and Philipp Ludwig von Seidel, and is similar to the Jacobi method. Though it can be applied to any matrix with non-zero elements on the diagonals, convergence is only guaranteed if the matrix is either strictly diagonally dominant, or symmetric and positive definite. It was only mentioned in a private letter from Gauss to his student Gerling in 1823. A publication was not delivered before 1874 by Seidel.

Description 
The Gauss–Seidel method is an iterative technique for solving a square system of  linear equations. Let  be a square system of  linear equations, where:

Matrix-based formula 
The solution is obtained iteratively via

where the matrix  is decomposed into a lower triangular component , and a strictly upper triangular component  such that .

Why the matrix-based formula works 
The system of linear equations may be rewritten as:

Analytically, this may be written as:

Element-based formula 

The procedure is generally continued until the changes made by an iteration are below some tolerance, such as a sufficiently small residual.

Discussion 
The element-wise formula for the Gauss–Seidel method is similar to that of the Jacobi method.

The computation of  uses the elements of  that have already been computed, and only the elements of  that have not been computed in the -th iteration. This means that, unlike the Jacobi method, only one storage vector is required as elements can be overwritten as they are computed, which can be advantageous for very large problems.

However, unlike the Jacobi method, the computations for each element are generally much harder to implement in parallel, since they can have a very long critical path, and are thus most feasible for sparse matrices. Furthermore, the values at each iteration are dependent on the order of the original equations.

Convergence
The convergence properties of the Gauss–Seidel method are dependent on the matrix A. Namely, the procedure is known to converge if either:
  is symmetric positive-definite, or
  is strictly or irreducibly diagonally dominant.

The Gauss–Seidel method sometimes converges even if these conditions are not satisfied.

Algorithm 

Since elements can be overwritten as they are computed in this algorithm, only one storage vector is needed, and vector indexing is omitted. The algorithm goes as follows:

 algorithm Gauss–Seidel method is
     inputs: , 
     
 
     
     repeat until convergence
             
                 if  ≠  then
                     
                 end if
             end (-loop)
             
         end (-loop)
         check if convergence is reached
     end (repeat)

Examples

An example for the matrix version

We want to use the equation

in the form

where:

We must decompose  into the sum of a lower triangular component  and a strict upper triangular component :

Now we can find:

First of all, we have to choose : we can only guess. The better the guess, the quicker the algorithm will perform.

We choose a starting point:

We can then calculate:

As expected, the algorithm converges to the exact solution:

In fact, the matrix  is strictly diagonally dominant (but not positive definite).

Another example for the matrix version

We want to use the equation

in the form

where:

We must decompose  into the sum of a lower triangular component  and a strict upper triangular component :

Now we can find:

First of all, we have to choose : we can only guess. The better the guess, the quicker will perform the algorithm.

We suppose:

We can then calculate:

If we test for convergence we'll find that the algorithm diverges. In fact, the matrix A is neither diagonally dominant nor positive definite.
Then, convergence to the exact solution

is not guaranteed and, in this case, will not occur.

An example for the equation version

Suppose given  equations where xn are vectors of these equations and starting point x0.
From the first equation solve for x1 in terms of   For the next equations substitute the previous values of xs.

To make it clear consider an example.

Suppose we choose  as the initial approximation, then the first approximate solution is given by

Using the approximations obtained, the iterative procedure is repeated until the desired accuracy has been reached.  The following are the approximated solutions after four iterations.

An example using Python and NumPy
The following numerical procedure simply iterates to produce the solution vector.

import numpy as np

ITERATION_LIMIT = 1000

# initialize the matrix
A = np.array(
    [
        [10.0, -1.0, 2.0, 0.0],
        [-1.0, 11.0, -1.0, 3.0],
        [2.0, -1.0, 10.0, -1.0],
        [0.0, 3.0, -1.0, 8.0],
    ]
)
# initialize the RHS vector
b = np.array([6.0, 25.0, -11.0, 15.0])

print("System of equations:")
for i in range(A.shape[0]):
    row = [f"{A[i,j]:3g}*x{j+1}" for j in range(A.shape[1])]
    print("[{0}] = [{1:3g}]".format(" + ".join(row), b[i]))

x = np.zeros_like(b)
for it_count in range(1, ITERATION_LIMIT):
    x_new = np.zeros_like(x)
    print(f"Iteration {it_count}: {x}")
    for i in range(A.shape[0]):
        s1 = np.dot(A[i, :i], x_new[:i])
        s2 = np.dot(A[i, i + 1 :], x[i + 1 :])
        x_new[i] = (b[i] - s1 - s2) / A[i, i]
    if np.allclose(x, x_new, rtol=1e-8):
        break
    x = x_new

print(f"Solution: {x}")
error = np.dot(A, x) - b
print(f"Error: {error}")

Produces the output:

System of equations:
[ 10*x1 +  -1*x2 +   2*x3 +   0*x4] = [  6]
[ -1*x1 +  11*x2 +  -1*x3 +   3*x4] = [ 25]
[  2*x1 +  -1*x2 +  10*x3 +  -1*x4] = [-11]
[  0*x1 +   3*x2 +  -1*x3 +   8*x4] = [ 15]
Iteration 1: [ 0.  0.  0.  0.]
Iteration 2: [ 0.6         2.32727273 -0.98727273  0.87886364]
Iteration 3: [ 1.03018182  2.03693802 -1.0144562   0.98434122]
Iteration 4: [ 1.00658504  2.00355502 -1.00252738  0.99835095]
Iteration 5: [ 1.00086098  2.00029825 -1.00030728  0.99984975]
Iteration 6: [ 1.00009128  2.00002134 -1.00003115  0.9999881 ]
Iteration 7: [ 1.00000836  2.00000117 -1.00000275  0.99999922]
Iteration 8: [ 1.00000067  2.00000002 -1.00000021  0.99999996]
Iteration 9: [ 1.00000004  1.99999999 -1.00000001  1.        ]
Iteration 10: [ 1.  2. -1.  1.]
Solution: [ 1.  2. -1.  1.]
Error: [  2.06480930e-08  -1.25551054e-08   3.61417563e-11   0.00000000e+00]

Program to solve arbitrary no. of equations using Matlab
The following code uses the formula

function x = gauss_seidel(A, b, x, iters)
    for i = 1:iters
        for j = 1:size(A,1)
            x(j) = (b(j) - sum(A(j,:)'.*x) + A(j,j)*x(j)) / A(j,j);
        end
    end
end

See also
Gaussian belief propagation
Iterative method. Linear systems
Kaczmarz method (a "row-oriented" method, whereas Gauss-Seidel is "column-oriented." See, for example, this paper.)
Matrix splitting
Richardson iteration

Notes

References
 .
 .

External links

Gauss–Seidel from www.math-linux.com
Gauss–Seidel From Holistic Numerical Methods Institute
 Gauss Siedel Iteration from www.geocities.com
The Gauss-Seidel Method
Bickson
Matlab code
C code example

Numerical linear algebra
Articles with example pseudocode
Relaxation (iterative methods)
Articles with example Python (programming language) code
Articles with example MATLAB/Octave code